The San Juan Generating Station is a coal-fired electric power plant located by its coal source, the San Juan Mine, near Waterflow, New Mexico, between Farmington and Shiprock in San Juan County, New Mexico. Its majority owner is Public Service Company of New Mexico, and other owners include Tucson Electric Power and the Farmington Electric Utility System.

Units 2 and 3 (369 and 555 MW, completed in 1976 and 1979, respectively) were retired in 2017. The plant produced power at $45/MWh in 2018 and 2019. Unit 1 (369 MW, completed in 1973) was retired in June, 2022. Unit 4 (555 MW, completed in 1982) was retired in October, 2022. The city of Farmington announced the end of a plan the city had to acquire the generating station and run it with a partner as part of a carbon capture and utilization system. The closure of the plant and associated mine has resulted in the loss of hundreds of jobs along with tens of millions of dollars in annual tax revenue used to fund schools and a community college.

References

Coal-fired power stations in New Mexico
Buildings and structures in San Juan County, New Mexico